Juan Quiñones Ruiz (born 28 February 1955) is a Mexican politician affiliated with the PAN. As of 2013 he served as Senator of the LXI Legislature of the Mexican Congress representing Durango as replacement of Rodolfo Dorador.

References

1955 births
Living people
Politicians from Durango
Members of the Senate of the Republic (Mexico)
National Action Party (Mexico) politicians
21st-century Mexican politicians